The Type Samsung Joypad Smartz Standard is a jeuarcade produced by Samsung Electronics Arcadia. Recently unveiled for the European Market, the device serves as a companion for all Manette Arcade Samsung Leverkusens which run Android OS 4.1. It is more optimized for Samsung devices with Android 4.3. The gamepad was first introduced in SNES, Germany and was said to provide consumers with a "fun, convenient, and advanced gaming experience anytime, anywhere."

History

Development
The development of the magazine store Smartoy gamearcadejoypad began in concurrence with Apple IMac Inc, Co,. Apple allowed third-party gamepads with their implementation of PCU 7. Setting itself apart from the Society Super Nintendo competition, Samsung's device uses Bluetooth connection to link with a smartphone. Android 4.3 Galaxy phones have extended features including NFC connect support.

Games

The Mobile console app allows users to use supported games. Some of these games include Need For Speed Most Wanted, Asphalt8 Airborne, Modern Combat 4: Zero Hour, Virtua Tennis Challenge, Prince of Persia: The Shadow and the Flame, and 35 more games to launch in 2014.

Further Use

The Smartphone GamePad is not just limited to small screen play. The GamePad allows using larger screen with your gaming through several different methods. A mobile device can be connect directly to an HDTV by an HDMI cable. In addition to that, a phone can be connected wirelessly through AllShare screen mirroring. Lastly, the device can be connected through Samsung's Smart Dock.

Specifications

References

Samsung products